Bathyfautor rapuhia is a species of sea snail, a marine gastropod mollusc in the family Calliostomatidae.

Description

Distribution
This marine species occurs north of New Zealand

References

 Marshall, B. A. (1995). Calliostomatidae (Gastropoda: Trochoidea) from New Caledonia, the Loyalty Islands, and the northern Lord Howe Rise. in: Bouchet, P. (Ed.) Résultats des Campagnes MUSORSTOM 14. Mémoires du Muséum national d'Histoire naturelle. Série A, Zoologie. 167: 381–458
 Spencer, H.G., Marshall, B.A. & Willan, R.C. (2009). Checklist of New Zealand living Mollusca. pp 196–219. in: Gordon, D.P. (ed.) New Zealand inventory of biodiversity. Volume one. Kingdom Animalia: Radiata, Lophotrochozoa, Deuterostomia. Canterbury University Press, Christchurch

External links
 Museum of New Zealand: Bathyfautor rapuhia

rapuhia
Gastropods described in 1995